Chanticlare (often spelled Chanteclair) was a Gold Coast estate in Flower Hill, on Long Island, in New York.

Description

Overview 
Chanticlare was constructed in the 1920s for attorney and Union Carbide executive Jesse J. Ricks. The mansion, designed in the English Tudor-style by Frederick A. Godley, featured 42-rooms – including a music room/ballroom.

Failed preservation efforts 
In the 1960s, following the deaths of Jesse Ricks and his wife, their children would sell off the remaining land. Originally, the developers of the Chanticlare at Flower Hill subdivision, Edwin and Walter Ketay, wanted to save the mansion, and made attempts to do so. 

One of the plans for its preservation was for C.W. Post University (now LIU Post) to purchase it and use the space as a music school, an accounting school, and/or administrative offices, amongst other proposed uses by the school. However, in 1967, C.W. Post ultimately chose not to buy the property. 

The Ketays soon after tried getting the Nassau County Cultural Society to occupy the home – although the plan was largely opposed by residents. 

With all preservation efforts failing, preserving the building proved to be too costly, and the estate was ultimately demolished in the late 1960s and replaced with an additional 4 homes as part of an amended plat map and plan for the Chanticlare at Flower Hill subdivision made by Edwin and Walter Ketay.

Remnants of the estate

Chanticlare pipe organ 
In 1968, the pipe organ formerly located in Chanticlare's music room was donated by John Ricks and Jane Ricks-King, the children of Mr. and Mrs. Jesse Ricks, to Hofstra University in honor of their late parents. 

The three-bank Aeolian electro-pneumatic pipe organ, valued at $115,000 in 1968, was installed in the Adams Playhouse at Hofstra, along with a memorial plaque. In order to house the components of the instrument, Hofstra had to add two chambers onto the Adams Playhouse, totaling .

The donation of the organ meant that students at Hofstra studying the organ could practice on-campus as opposed to having to travel off-campus to the nearby Episcopal Cathedral of the Incarnation.

See also 

 Harbor Hill – Another Gold Coast estate, which was located in nearby East Hills.
Sunset Hill – Another Gold Coast estate, which was partially in both Flower Hill and Plandome.

References 

Flower Hill, New York
Mansions of Gold Coast, Long Island
Houses in Nassau County, New York
Demolished buildings and structures in New York (state)
Buildings and structures demolished in the 1960s